Lentibacillus is a Gram-variable bacterial genus from the family of Bacillaceae.

References

Further reading 
 
 
 

Bacillaceae
Bacteria genera